Pyridostigmine is a medication used to treat myasthenia gravis and underactive bladder. It is also used together with atropine to end the effects of neuromuscular blocking medication of the non-depolarizing type. It is typically given by mouth but can also be used by injection. The effects generally begin within 45 minutes and last up to 6 hours.

Common side effects include nausea, diarrhea, frequent urination, and abdominal pain. More severe side effects include low blood pressure, weakness, and allergic reactions. It is unclear if use in pregnancy is safe for the fetus. Pyridostigmine is an acetylcholinesterase inhibitor in the cholinergic family of medications. It works by blocking the action of acetylcholinesterase and therefore increases the levels of acetylcholine.

Pyridostigmine was patented in 1945 and came into medical use in 1955. It is on the World Health Organization's List of Essential Medicines. Pyridostigmine is available as a generic medication.

Medical uses
Pyridostigmine is used to treat muscle weakness in people with myasthenia gravis or forms of congenital myasthenic syndrome and to combat the effects of curariform drug toxicity. Pyridostigmine bromide has been FDA approved for military use during combat situations as an agent to be given prior to exposure to the nerve agent Soman in order to increase survival. Used in particular during the first Gulf War, pyridostigmine bromide has been implicated as a causal factor in Gulf War syndrome.

With pyridostigmine classified as a type of parasympathomimetic, it can be used to treat underactive bladder.

Pyridostigmine sometimes is used to treat orthostatic hypotension. It may also be of benefit in chronic axonal polyneuropathy.

It is also being prescribed 'off-label' for postural tachycardia syndrome as well as complications resulting from Ehlers–Danlos syndrome.

Contraindications
Pyridostigmine bromide is contraindicated in cases of mechanical intestinal or urinary obstruction and should be used with caution in patients with bronchial asthma.

Side effects

Common side effects include:
 Sweating
 Diarrhea 
 Nausea
 Vomiting 
 Abdominal cramps
 Increased salivation
 Tearing
 Increased bronchial secretions
 Constricted pupils
 Facial flushing due to vasodilation
 Erectile dysfunction

Additional side effects include:
 Muscle twitching 
 Muscle cramps and weakness

Mechanism of action
Pyridostigmine inhibits acetylcholinesterase in the synaptic cleft, thus slowing down the hydrolysis of acetylcholine.  Like its predecessor neostigmine, it is a quaternary carbamate inhibitor of cholinesterase that does not cross the blood–brain barrier. It carbamylates about 30% of peripheral cholinesterase enzyme, and the carbamylated enzyme eventually regenerates by natural hydrolysis and excess acetylcholine (ACh) levels revert to normal.

The ACh diffuses across the synaptic cleft and binds to receptors on the post synaptic membrane, causing an influx of sodium (Na+,) resulting in depolarization.  If large enough, this depolarization results in an action potential.  To prevent constant stimulation once the ACh is released, an enzyme called acetylcholinesterase is present in the endplate membrane close to the receptors on the post synaptic membrane, and quickly hydrolyses ACh.

Names
Pyridostigmine bromide is available under the trade names Mestinon (Valeant Pharmaceuticals), Regonol and Gravitor (SUN Pharma).

References

External links 
 

Acetylcholinesterase inhibitors
Dimethylamino compounds
Pyridinium compounds
Aromatic carbamates
Peripherally selective drugs
World Health Organization essential medicines
Wikipedia medicine articles ready to translate